Homage to Count Basie is an album by the Bob Mintzer Big Band that won the Grammy Award for Best Large Jazz Ensemble Album in 2002.

Track listing

Personnel

 Bob Mintzer – clarinet, flute, baritone saxophone, tenor saxophone, liner notes, producer
 Lawrence Feldman – clarinet, flute, alto saxophone
 Pete Yellin – clarinet, flute, alto saxophone
 Scott Robinson – clarinet, flute, tenor saxophone
 Roger Rosenberg – baritone saxophone
 Bob Millikan – flugelhorn, trumpet
 Byron Stripling – flugelhorn, trumpet
 Scott Wendholt – flugelhorn, trumpet
 Michael Philip Mossman – flugelhorn
 Michael Davis – trombone
 Larry Farrell – trombone
 Keith O'Quinn – trombone
 Dave Taylor – bass trombone
 Phil Markowitz – piano
 Dennis Irwin – double bass
 James Chirillo – guitar
 Brian Brake – drums
 John Riley – drums
 Tom Jung – producer, engineer, recorder
 Mark Conese – assistant engineer

References

Grammy Award for Best Large Jazz Ensemble Album